This is a list of films which have placed number one at the box office in New Zealand during 2019.

Highest-grossing films

References

See also
 List of New Zealand films – New Zealand films by year
 2019 in film

2019
New Zealand
Box office